Wawelno  is a village in the administrative district of Gmina Komprachcice, within Opole County, Opole Voivodeship, in south-western Poland.

The village has an approximate population of 1,200.

References

Wawelno